Tongji University is a national public research university located in Shanghai. Established in 1907 by the German government together with German physicians in Shanghai, Tongji is one of the longest-standing, most selective, and most prestigious universities in China under the Project 985 and Double First Class University Plan. It is a Chinese state Class A Double First Class University.

Tongji University is renowned for its architecture, engineering and business programs which consistently rank among the best in the world. Tongji's architecture program was rated the top overall architecture program in China according to China's University and College Admission System (CACUS) and ranks as the 13th best architecture program in the world according to the QS World University Rankings.The College of Civil Engineering is considered the best in the world according to several widely cited international rankings, including Shanghai Ranking, U.S. News Rankings, URAP ranking and NTU Ranking. The U.S. News & World Report Best Global University Ranking ranks Tongji University at 15th worldwide in engineering. The School of Design and Innovation was ranked 12th among art and design schools worldwide in 2022, and the top in Asia, according to the QS. The School of Economics and Management (Tongji SEM) is one of 74 business schools in the world being triple accredited by the European Quality Improvement System (EQUIS), the Association to Advance Collegiate Schools of Business (AACSB) and the Association of MBAs (AMBA). Tongji University is a member of the Yangtze Delta Universities Alliance and Asian-European Laotse Universities Network. According to the 2022 QS World University Rankings, Tongji University ranked 8th nationally. Tongji University consistently features in the top 300th global universities.

The university possesses a faculty of more than 2,815 scholars, including 27 members from the Chinese Academy of Sciences and the Chinese Academy of Engineering. Currently, Tongji University owns 29 colleges, 11 affiliated hospitals, and 7 affiliated primary and secondary schools.

History

The history of Tongji University can be traced back to 1907 when the German Medical School for the Chinese in Shanghai was founded by the German government together with the German physicians Erich Paulun, Oscar von Schab and Paul Krieg. The school was affiliated with the Tongji-Hospital the German physicians had established in Shanghai on the initiative of Paulun. The name Tongji, which is a phonetic approximation in Shanghainese of German deutsche ("German"), suggests cooperating by riding the same boat. The school was expanded to include engineering in its programs and got its new name as German Medical and Engineering School for the Chinese in Shanghai in 1912. It was formally established as a Chinese university under the name of Tongji University in 1923/1924 and was renamed as National Tongji University in 1927. During the Second Sino-Japanese War (1937–1945), the university campus was moved from Shanghai first to Zhejiang Province, then to Jiangxi Province and Yunnan Province and later to Sichuan Province. It was eventually moved back to Shanghai in 1946. It then grew to be a comprehensive university which offered programs in science, engineering, medicine, arts, and law. Following a nationwide campaign of reorganizing schools and departments between universities in 1952, Tongji University became a university knowns for its civil engineering and architecture programs. Tongji is also the first university that introduced Urban Planning into China. In 1952, the first twelve full professors of Tongji are: Li Guohao, 周念先 (Zhou Nianxian), 钱仲毅 (Qian Zhongyi), 陈超 (Chen Chao), 周方白 (周圭), 李寿康, et al.

As a university which had established a reputation for its research, Tongji became one of the first batch of universities which were authorized by the China State Council to establish its Graduate School. As one of the leading universities, it was successful in its application for the 211 Program which provided universities with substantial government fund. In 1995, the university became one to be jointly supported by the State Education Commission and the Shanghai Municipal Government. In 1996 the university merged with Shanghai Institute of Urban Construction and Shanghai Institute of Building Materials. The merger was acknowledged by the State Council as "Tongji Model" in the system renovation of higher institutions in China. In April 2000, the expanded Tongji merged again with Shanghai Railway University. Now Tongji University has become a comprehensive university which offers a wide range of programs in science, engineering, medicine, arts, law, economics and management.

Timeline
November 2010 - Signed a cooperation agreement with Instituto Superior Técnico making IST the Portuguese Campus of Tongji University
July 2005 - Signed a cooperation agreement with Politecnico di Milano and Politecnico di Torino concerning the development of Sino-Italian University Campus in Shanghai and establishment of a Sino-Italian House, one year later a dual bachelor's degree project in engineering, called PoliTong, was launched
2002 - Listed in Project 985
April 2000 - Merged with Shanghai Railway University (a merge between Shanghai Railway College and Shanghai Railway Medical College in May 1995)
August 1996 - Merged with Shanghai Institute of Urban Construction and Shanghai Institute of Building Materials
November 1995 - Listed in Project 211
October 1995 - Declared to be jointly built by the former State Education Commission and the Shanghai Municipal Government
December 1978 - Upon consent by the State Council, resumed connection with Germany and became the window of the cultural, technology and science exchanges between China and Germany
February 1972 - Tongji University merged with the Marine Geology Department of East China Normal University
1952 - The Departments of Mathematics, Physics and Chemistry in College of Science merged into Fudan University, the Departments of Machinery, Electrical Engineering and Ship Manufacture merged into Shanghai Jiaotong University. In the meanwhile, Tongji University merged the Civil Engineering Department and School of Architecture from   Saint John's University, Shanghai and several other universities.
1951 - The Department of Biology in College of Science merged into East China Normal University, the Medical School and the Department of Survey in College of Engineering moved to Wuhan, Hubei Province
September 1949 - College of Literature and Arts, College of Law merged into Fudan University
June 1949 - Tongji University was taken over by Shanghai Military Control Commission
August 1946 - College of Science expanded as College of Literature and Science moved back to Shanghai
April 1946 - Moved back to Shanghai
1945 - Established the College of Law
October 1940 - Moved Lizhuang in Yibin, Sichuan Province
Winter 1938 - Moved to Kunming, Yunnan Province
September 1937 - Moved to the south of China due to the Second Sino-Japanese War
August 1927 - Renamed as National Tongji University 
May 20, 1924 - Approved by the government to be one of the first national universities in China. 
March 1922 - Renamed as Tongji Medical and Engineering University
October 1907 - Established as Tongji German Medical School

Present

The university now registers over 50,000 students at all levels from certificate and diploma courses to Bachelor's Degrees, Master's, Ph.D. programs and post doctoral attachments. There are over 4,200 academic staff for teaching and/or research, among whom there are 6 Members of Chinese Academy of Science, 7 Members of Chinese Academy of Engineering, over 530 professors and 1,300 associate professors. The university offers diverse courses in its 81 Bachelor's degrees, 151 Masters, 58 PhD programs and 13 post doctoral mobile stations. Tongji University is particularly famous for its Civil Engineering and Architecture programs. Its Civil Engineering, Architecture programs and Transportation Engineering are ranked Top 1 in P.R. China and its architecture program is by far the most difficult to gain entry into. As one of the state leading centers for scientific research, the university has 5 state key laboratories and engineering research centers.

The university is active in promoting cooperation and exchanges with other countries. It has established links with Australia, Austria, Canada, Finland, France, Germany, Japan, Spain, Switzerland, UK and USA in the fields of education, science, technology and economics. A number of international joint programs have been established between the university and its counterparts in other countries in recent years. In 2006, the university enrolled 1,829 international students.

Anniversary Day
On June 3, 1907, German Medical School was opened in Shanghai. On October 1 of the same year, a ceremony was held. The Anniversary Day was initially set to May 18, on which day in 1924 the Wusong campus was opened. In 1925 and 1926, ceremonies were held on May 18. On the staff meeting on January 19, 1931, the Anniversary Day of National Tongji University was decided to be postponed to May 20, two days after the national mourn with half-mast over the death of Mr. Chen Yingshi (Chen Qimei), a politician. Tongji celebrates the Anniversary Day on May 20 since then.

Coincidentally, on May 20 of 1924, Tongji Medical School was approved to be a "university" by the Department of Education of China. At that moment, both the medical school and the engineering school were approved.

Campus

Tongji University is titled the State-level Garden Unit for Excellent Afforestation. lts five campuses are located in the municipal city of Shanghai, covering an area of 2,460,000 m2. The Siping Campus is situated on Siping Road; the West Campus on Zhennan Road; the North Campus on Gonghexing Road; the East Campus on Wudong Road and the Jiading Campus is located in Shanghai International Automobile City in Anting, Jiading District. In the year 2009, the East Campus was sold to Shanghai University of Finance and Economics.

 Siping Campus (Main campus)

 West Campus
 North Campus
 Jiading Campus

Academics

Colleges, schools and departments
College of Architecture and Urban Planning
College of Civil Engineering
College of Design and Innovation
Law School
School of Software Engineering
College of Electronics and Information Engineering
College of Environmental Science and Engineering
School of Material Science and Engineering
College of Mechanical Engineering
College of Transportation Engineering
College of Automotive Engineering
School of Aerospace Engineering and Applied Mechanics
School of Physics Science and Engineering
School of Chemical Science and Engineering
School of Mathematics
School of Foreign Languages
School of Humanities
School of Economics and Management
College of Arts and Media
College of Life Science and Technology
School of Ocean and Earth Science
School of Medicine
Institute of Rail Transit

Institutes and research centers
Institute of Acoustics
Intellectual Property Institute
The Institute for Biomedical Engineering & Nano Science (iNANO)
Institute of Further Education
Institute of E-Education
Institute of Higher Technology
Institute of Vocational and Technical Education
Institute of Automobile Marketing
German Academic Center
Sino-German College
Sino-German College of Engineering
Sino-French College of Engineering and Management
Sino-Italian Campus
UNEP-Tongji Institute for Environment and Sustainable Development (IESD)
Architectural Design and Research Institute
Research Institute of Modern Agricultural Science and Engineering
The International School of Tongji University
Center for Asia-Pacific Studies

State key laboratories
State Key Laboratory of Disaster Prevention in Civil Engineering
State Key Laboratory of Pollution Control and Resource Reuse
State Key Laboratory of Modern Technology of Urban Planning and Design
State Key Laboratory of Marine Geology

National Research Center
National Engineering Research Center of Urban Pollution Control

Key provincial-level and ministerial-level laboratories
Key Laboratory of Road and Traffic Engineering of the State Ministry of Education
Key Laboratory of Yangtze Water Environment of the State Ministry of Education
Shanghai Key Laboratory of Metal Function Materials Research and Application
Key Laboratory of Modem Engineering Geodesy of The State Bureau of Surveying and Mapping
Open Laboratory of Physiological and Psychology in Railway Health Care
Open Laboratory of Clinical Medical Molecular Biology in Railway Health Care
Open Laboratory of Nutrition and Food Hygiene in Railway Health Care
Open Laboratory of Children's Stomatology in Railway Health Care
Open Laboratory of Venereology in Railway Health Care

Key provincial-level and ministerial-level research centers

Information and Technology Research Center of Civil Engineering of the State Ministry of Education
Shanghai Engineering Research Center of Constriction Robot

State key disciplines
Marine Geology
Structural Engineering
Engineering Mechanics
Bridge and Tunnel Engineering
Material Science
Road and Railway Engineering
Urban Planning and Design
Traffic and Transportation Planning and Management
Environmental Engineering
Geo-technical Engineering

Members of the Chinese Academy of Sciences 
Sun Jun (孙钧)
Ma Zaitian (马在田)
Wang Pinxian
Yao Xi (姚熹)
Zheng Shiling (郑时龄)
Chang Qing (常青)
Zhou Xingming (周兴铭)
Chen Yihan (陈义汉)
Pei Gang (裴钢)

Members of the Chinese Academy of Engineering 

Haifan (项海帆)
Li Tongbao (李同保)
Guo Chongqing (郭重庆)
Zhiqiang Wu (吴志强)
Dai Fudong
Fan Lichu
Lu Yaoru (卢耀如)
Shen Zuyan
Zhong Zhihua (钟志华)
Chen Jie (陈杰)

Partnerships 
Tongji has a strategic partnership with Technische Universität Darmstadt, Technische Universität Graz and Ecole des Ponts ParisTech.

Rankings and reputation 

Tongji consistently features in the top 300th global universities as ranked by the Academic Ranking of World Universities, the QS World University Rankings, the Times Higher Education World University Rankings and the U.S. News & World Report Best Global Universities Ranking.

Tongji ranked 212nd in the world according to the 2023 QS World University Rankings. 

The Times Higher Education World University Rankings 2023 placed Tongji 251–300th worldwide and 12th in China.

Tongji graduates are highly desired in China and worldwide. In 2017, its Graduate Employability rankings placed at #101 in the world in the QS Graduate Employability Rankings. Tongji University is regarded as one of the most reputable Chinese universities by the Times Higher Education World Reputation Rankings where it ranked # 151 globally.

Subject Rankings

College of Civil Engineering 
The College of Civil Engineering is considered the best in the world according to several widely cited international rankings, including Shanghai Ranking, U.S. News Rankings, URAP ranking and NTU Ranking.

Engineering 
The U.S. News & World Report Best Global University Ranking ranks Tongji University at 15th in engineering among Best Global Universities.

Architecture 
Tongji's College of Architecture and Urban Planning is home to one of the best architecture programs in the world, ranking as the number 13 architecture school worldwide in the 2021 QS World University Rankings and the top overall architecture program in China according to China's University and College Admission System (CACUS).

Arts and Design 
The School of Design and Innovation was ranked 12th among art and design schools worldwide in 2022, and the top in Asia, according to QS.

Presidents

Erich Paulun (1907-1909)
Oscar von Schab (福沙伯) (1909-1917)
Berrens (贝伦子) (1912-1919&1921-1927)
Shen Enfu (沈恩孚) (1917-1923) (acting)
Yuan Xitao (袁希涛) (1923-1927) (acting)
Ruan Shangjie (阮尚介) (1917-1927)
Zhang Zhongsu (张仲苏) (1927-1929)
Zhang Qun (张群) (1929.3-1929.6)
Hu Shuhua (胡庶华) (1929-1932)
Weng Zhilong (翁之龙) (1932-1939)
Zhao Shiqing (赵士卿) (1939-1940)
Zhou Junshi (周均时) (1940-1942)
Ding Wenyuan (丁文渊) (1942-1944)
Xu Songming (徐诵明) (1944-1946)
Dong Xifan (董洗凡) (1946-1947)
Ding Wenyuan (丁文渊) (1947-1948)
Xia Jianbai (夏坚白) (1948-1952)
Xue Shangshi (薛尚实) (1953.1-1959.7)
Wang Tao (王涛) (1959-1977)
Li Guohao (李国豪) (1977.10-1984.4)
Jiang Jingbo (江景波) (1984.4-1989.2)
Gao Tingyao (高廷耀) (1989.2-1995.2)
Wu Qidi (吴启迪) (1995.2-2003.7)
Wan Gang (万钢) (2003.7-2007.8)
Pei Gang (裴钢) (2007.8-2016.9)
Zhong Zhihua(钟志华) (2016.9-2018.7)
Chen Jie (陈杰) (2018.7-2023.2)
Zheng Qinghua (郑庆华) (2023.2-present)

Noted alumni

Some noted alumni of Tongji University are:
Li Guohao (李国豪), Former President of Tongji University, World Famous Bridge Engineering Expert
Wang Shu (王澍), 2012 Pritzker Prize recipient
Qiao Shi (乔石), Former Chairman of the Standing Committee of the National People's Congress, PRC
Li Linsi (厉麟似), China's Mahatma Gandhi, diplomatic consultant to Chiang Kai-shek
Qian Xinzhong (钱信忠), Minister of Health of the People's Republic of China
Tang Dengjie (唐登杰), Minister of Civil Affairs of the People's Republic of China 
Qiu Fazu (裘法祖), Surgeon
Wu Zhongbi (武忠弼), Physiologist
Wu Mengchao (吴孟超), Surgeon, Winner of the State Preeminent Science and Technology Award of China (2005)
Pan Yunhe (潘云鹤), Computer Scientist, Vice Chairman of the Chinese Academy of Engineering
Bei Shizhang (贝时璋), Physiologist, "Father of Chinese Biophysics"
Wan Gang (万钢), Minister of Science and Technology of the People's Republic of China
Xie Guozhong (谢国忠), Economist
Wang Guangtao (汪光焘), Minister of Construction of the People's Republic of China
Kwong-Chai Chu (Zhu Guangcai) (朱光彩), Hydraulic Engineer

See also
Tongji Medical College

References

External links
Official website
Tongji.net
Tongji university school of medicine
Tongji @ MITBBS
Centennial Anniversary
Centenary Celebration of Tongji University
Tongji University Alumni Association
Tongji University Alumni Association of Germany
Tongji University Alumni Association of America
Tongji University Alumni Singapore
Tongji University Hong Kong Alumni Association 
Tongji University Image Library
Tongji University Three-dimensional map

 
Universities and colleges in Shanghai
Educational institutions established in 1907
Project 211
Project 985
Plan 111
Universities in China with English-medium medical schools
1907 establishments in China
Architecture schools in China
Vice-ministerial universities in China